Hector Javier Morales Sanchez (born 19 January 1993) is a Cuban footballer who plays as a midfielder.

Career
On July 29, 2020, Morales made his USL debut with Miami FC in the team's second match of the 2020 season. He had previously played with the team during 2019 in both the National Premier Soccer League and National Independent Soccer Association.

Career Statistics

Honors
AFC Ann Arbor
Great Lakes Conference Championship (1): 2017

Miami FC
NPSL
Sunshine Conference Championship (1): 2019
South Region Championship (1): 2019
National Championship (1): 2019

NISA
East Coast Conference Championship (1): 2019

References

External links
 USL Championship profile
 Soccerway profile

1993 births
Living people
People from Havana
Defecting Cuban footballers
Association football forwards
Cuban footballers
Cuba international footballers
Miami FC players
National Premier Soccer League players
National Independent Soccer Association players
USL Championship players
Cuban expatriate footballers
Expatriate soccer players in the United States
Cuban expatriate sportspeople in the United States